On 3 December 1996 an IED detonated on the southbound tracks of the Port-Royal Réseau Express Régional (RER) station in Paris, France. Four people were killed in the bombing: two French citizens, a Moroccan and a Canadian.

Following the bombing, French officials activated the "Vigipirate" nationwide security plan drawn up a year earlier in the wake of a series of bombings by the Armed Islamic Group of Algeria (GIA). The plan included police and army patrols in sensitive public areas and spot checks across the country.

Jean-Louis Bruguière and Jean-François Ricard were in charge of the bombing file. No group took responsibility for the attack, but the GIA was suspected of being behind the attack. However, unlike this bombing, the group had claimed all the bombings in the campaign.

See also

 1995 France bombings

References 

RER bombing
RER bombing
1996 murders in France
Armed Islamic Group of Algeria
1996 RER bombing
Attacks on railway stations in Europe
December 1996 crimes
December 1996 events in Europe
Improvised explosive device bombings in 1996
1996 RER
Mass murder in 1996
1996 RER bombing
Terrorist incidents in France in 1996
Terrorist incidents on railway systems in Europe
Terrorist incidents on underground rapid transit systems
Building bombings in France